The Creanga Mare (also: Craca Mare) is a right tributary of the river Târnava Mică in Romania. It flows into the Târnava Mică in Bucin.

References

Rivers of Romania
Rivers of Harghita County